Protentomon barandiarani is a species of proturan in the family Protentomidae. It is found in Africa and Europe.

References

Protura
Articles created by Qbugbot
Animals described in 1947